"Summer Lovin'" is a single by house music duo Musikk. It was released in 2004 as a digital download. The song peaked at number 7 on the Danish Singles Chart. It features vocals from Danish singer Jon Nørgaard under the name John Rock. The song was also recorded in Simlish for some foreign language versions of The Sims 2: Nightlife.

Track listing
Digital download
 "Summer Lovin'" (Original Radio Edit) - 3:28
 "Summer Lovin'" (INF:RMX Radio Edit) - 3:33
 "Summer Lovin'" (Donnie Brasco Remix) - 3:53
 "Summer Lovin'" (Original Club Mix) - 5:13
 "Summer Lovin'" (INF:RMX Club Mix) - 6:27
 "Summer Lovin'" (Donnie Brasco Vocal Club Mix) - 9:32
 "Summer Lovin'" (Jake Wattson Indian Summer Mix) - 6:10
 "Summer Lovin'" (Monday Morning Mix) - 7:21
 "Summer Lovin'" (Donnie Brasco Vocal Dub Mix) - 9:32
 "Summer Lovin'" (Instrumental) - 3:26
 "Summer Lovin'" (Acapella 1) - 3:29
 "Summer Lovin'" (Acapella 2) - 3:29

Chart performance

Release history

References

2004 singles
Jon Nørgaard songs
2004 songs
EMI Records singles
Songs written by Paw Lagermann
Songs written by Lina Rafn
Songs written by Jon Nørgaard